Peter Steinmann (born 11 July 1962) is a Swiss modern pentathlete. He competed at the 1984, 1988 and 1992 Summer Olympics.

References

External links
 

1962 births
Living people
Swiss male modern pentathletes
Olympic modern pentathletes of Switzerland
Modern pentathletes at the 1984 Summer Olympics
Modern pentathletes at the 1988 Summer Olympics
Modern pentathletes at the 1992 Summer Olympics